Dumitrița is a commune in Bistrița-Năsăud County, Transylvania, Romania. It is composed of three villages: Budacu de Sus, Dumitrița and Ragla. These were part of Cetate Commune until 2002, when they were split off.

References

Communes in Bistrița-Năsăud County
Localities in Transylvania